John Kerfoot may refer to:
 John Barrett Kerfoot, college president and Episcopal bishop
 John D. Kerfoot, mayor of Dallas